Microhyla berdmorei (common names: Berdmore's chorus frog, Berdmore's narrow-mouthed frog, Burmese microhylid frog, large pygmy frog, Pegu rice frog) is a species of narrow-mouthed frog found in eastern India, Bangladesh, southernmost China (Yunnan), Mainland Southeast Asia as well as Borneo and Sumatra. Frogs from Bangladesh probably represent an unnamed species.

Description
They have a characteristic yellowish belly. They have relatively long legs and can make impressive jumps.

Habitat
Microhyla berdmorei inhabits various types of moist evergreen forest. It is generally associated with hilly regions and often found near streams. Breeding mainly takes place in still pools. Male frogs form large choruses. It is a common species in suitable habitat (though not in Borneo).

Gallery

References

External links
Amphibian and Reptiles of Peninsular Malaysia - Microhyla berdmorei

berdmorei
Amphibians of Bangladesh
Amphibians of Myanmar
Amphibians of Cambodia
Amphibians of China
Frogs of India
Amphibians of Indonesia
Amphibians of Laos
Amphibians of Malaysia
Amphibians of Thailand
Amphibians of Vietnam
Amphibians described in 1856
Taxa named by Edward Blyth